The siege of Lal Masjid (code-named Operation Sunrise) was an armed confrontation in July 2007 between Islamic fundamentalist militants and the government of Pakistan, led by president Pervez Musharraf and prime minister Shaukat Aziz. The focal points of the operation were the Lal Masjid ("Red Mosque") and the Jamia Hafsa madrasah complex in Islamabad, Pakistan.

Since January 2006, Lal Masjid and the adjacent Jamia Hafsa madrasah had been operated by Islamic militants led by two brothers, Abdul Aziz and Abdul Rashid. This organisation advocated the imposition of Sharia (Islamic religious law) in Pakistan and openly called for the overthrow of the Pakistani government. Lal Masjid was in constant conflict with authorities in Islamabad for 18 months prior to the military operation. They engaged in violent demonstrations, destruction of property, kidnapping, arson, and armed clashes with the authorities. After a combination of events such as militants taking hostage the Chinese health care center's female workers and militants setting fire to the Ministry of Environment building and attacking the Army Rangers who guarded it, the military responded, and the siege of the Lal Masjid complex began. The military response was the result of not only pressure from locals but also diplomatic pressure from China.

The complex was besieged from 3 to 11 July 2007, while negotiations were attempted between the militants and the state's Shujaat Hussain and Ijaz-ul-Haq. Once negotiations failed, the complex was stormed and captured by the Pakistan Army's Special Service Group. The government reported that the operation resulted in 154 deaths, and the capture of 50 militants. It also prompted pro-Taliban rebels along the Afghan border to nullify a 10-month-old peace agreement with the Pakistani government. This event led to a surge in militancy and violence in Pakistan which resulted in more than 3,000 casualties in 2008.

Background

Lal Masjid 
The Lal Masjid was founded by Muhammad Abdullah Ghazi in 1965. In English, Lal Masjid translates to the "Red Mosque", and the name is derived from the red colour of the mosque's walls and interiors. Abdullah taught Islamic extremism and preached jihad during the Soviet–Afghan War. Since its founding, Lal Masjid was frequented by leaders of the Pakistani military and government. Muhammad Zia-ul-Haq, the Army Chief of Staff who later became president after seizing power in a coup d'état in 1977, was a close associate of Abdullah's. The mosque is located near the headquarters of Pakistan's Inter-Services Intelligence (ISI), and several staff members were known to go there for prayers.

After the Soviet–Afghan War ended in 1989, the mosque continued to function as a centre for Islamic extremist learning and housed several thousand male and female students in adjacent seminaries.

Maulana Qari Abdullah was assassinated at the mosque in 1998. On his death, his sons, Abdul Aziz and Abdul Rashid, assumed responsibility for the entire complex . The brothers admitted to having regular communication with many of the wanted leaders of al-Qaeda, including Osama bin Laden.

Jamia Hafsa was a madrassa for women located near Lal Masjid. It was the largest Islamic religious institution for women in the world, with more than 6,000 students. It was constructed by Maulana Qari Abdullah in 1992. After his assassination, supervision passed to his son Abdul Aziz. Students were taught general subjects, including mathematics and geography but were not tested on these subjects; the only exams were on religious subjects.

Following the 11 September 2001 attacks on the United States, Pakistani President Pervez Musharraf announced his support for the US-led War on Terror. This declaration sparked conflict with the Lal Masjid, whose leadership was openly pro-Taliban. Abdul Aziz and Abdul Rashid denied having any links to banned terrorist organisations but were vehemently opposed to the War on Terror and the conflict in Afghanistan. They openly condemned Musharraf and opposed Pakistani security forces, including the Pakistan Rangers and Islamabad Capital Territory police. The mosque became a source for speeches calling for the assassination of Musharraf. One of these speeches was delivered by Masood Azhar, whose Jaish-e-Mohammed group members were later involved in failed attempts to kill the president. In July 2005, Pakistani authorities attempted to raid the mosque in connection with their investigation into the 7 July 2005 London bombings, but the police were blocked by baton-wielding female students. After the raid, authorities apologised for the behaviour of the police.

After 2006 
During 2006 and the first half of 2007, students and mosque leaders continued to challenge the Pakistani government's authority by calling for Islamic law and to end co-operation with the United States. They launched an anti-vice campaign, kidnapping alleged prostitutes and burning films. Students at the Red Mosque's two affiliated seminaries launched a campaign for Shari'a, occupying a nearby children's library and embarking on vigilante raids through the capital to stop what they called "un-Islamic activities," such as DVD vendors, barber shops and a Chinese-run massage parlor that they accused of being a brothel.

Most students in the mosque were from the Khyber Pakhtunkhwa bordering Afghanistan.

A confrontation took place when the mosque launched a campaign against the demolition of mosques in Islamabad by the Capital Development Authority. After an illegally constructed mosque was destroyed, students of the seminaries launched an all-out campaign against the government. They blocked authorities from reaching the site and then occupied a nearby children's library building. This was carried out primarily by the female students. The students set up an around-the-clock vigil and promised a "fight to the death" when the government threatened to evict them. The situation was defused when the authorities opened negotiations. The government later reconstructed the demolished portions of the mosque compound. The Lal Masjid leadership demanded the reconstruction of six other demolished mosques in the capital city.

On 27 March 2007, female students from Jamia Hafsa kidnapped three women, who they accused of running a brothel, and seized two policemen. All of the women were released after supposedly confessing to running the brothel and were shown on the television wearing burqas. Also due in part to an intercession from the Chinese Ambassador, Luo Zhaohui. In an interview on the talk show "Capital Talk," Lal Masjid students claimed that the madam of the brothel had connections with influential government employees, specifically naming the Minister of Railways Shaikh Rasheed Ahmad. The neighbourhood police station allegedly had prior knowledge of or approved the kidnappings. On 6 April, Abdul Aziz established a sharia court in parallel with Pakistan's federal judicial system and pledged thousands of suicide attacks if the government attempted to close it.

Students continued to occupy the library and challenge governmental control by raiding a brothel. They also kidnapped ten Chinese nationals, as well as several law enforcement officials, women, and children. The approach taken by the Pakistani government in dealing with mosque issues led to accusations of leniency on the part of Musharraf, who felt he was too soft. After exchanging fire with Pakistani troops, students set fire to a Ministry of Environment building near Lal Masjid.

The Minister for Environment, Faisal Saleh Hayat, stated that he had requested security for the building, but authorities had failed to provide it. Contrary to claims made earlier, Hayat said the ministry was never ordered to vacate the premises before Pakistan Rangers deployed.

Timeline

Siege 

On 3 July 2007, a battle erupted between Pakistani security forces and students of Lal Masjid when law enforcement agencies extended the barbwire around the Masjid precinct. Riot police fired tear gas to disperse the students. Fighting continued, leaving nine people dead and approximately 150 injured. Among the dead were four mosque students, a TV news channel cameraman, a businessman, and a pedestrian. Within minutes, security forces closed off the area, and the capital's hospitals declared an emergency. Sporadic clashes continued as Pakistan Army troops deployed into the area.

On 4 July 2007, authorities announced an indefinite curfew in Sector G-6 of Islamabad, where Lal Masjid is located. The army received orders to shoot anyone leaving the mosque with weapons. The government offered Rs. 5,000 (equivalent to $50 USDs or £41 GBP), plus a free education, to anyone exiting the mosque unarmed. Women inside the mosque were also offered safe passage to their homes. Successive deadlines were extended, as mosque leaders allowed some students to surrender, requiring security forces to renegotiate extensions. Government authorities announced the first deadline for the occupants of Lal Masjid to surrender unconditionally as 15:30 Pakistan Standard Time (PST), and it was pushed back to 16:00, 18:00, 19:30 and then 21:30. The government said that as many as 600 armed militants remained inside the mosque.

Before dawn on 5 July 2007, Pakistani troops set off a series of explosions around the mosque. Gunfire was exchanged throughout the day, but open clashes apparently stopped. Deadline extensions continued on 5 July 2007, with the government planning to evacuate the mosque and Jamia Hafsa before the final assault. Interior Minister Aftab Ahmad Sherpao announced at a press conference that the government believed that between 300 and 400 students remained in the mosque, and only 50 to 60 were considered to be militants.

Following the fourth deadline, Abdul Aziz was captured trying to escape disguised as a woman wearing a burqa. Following the capture of this leader, about 800 male students and 400 female students of Jamia Hafsa surrendered to the authorities.

Abdul Aziz's younger brother, Abdul Rashid, had been negotiating with a government mediator. He claimed that the remaining students were willing to leave the mosque and lay down their arms, provided the government would grant them amnesty and not fire on them. Government officials were sceptical that Abdul Rashid would honour this agreement. In a telephone interview from a live transmission of Geo TV, Abdul Rashid denied all the charges against him and reiterated his innocence. He further negotiated with the government for his safe passage and a guarantee that no harm would come to his followers inside the mosque. He also received a promise that his ailing mother would receive medical care.

The siege continued on 6 July 2007. Negotiation talks continued between the besieged Lal Masjid administration and government authorities, without resolution. Twenty-one additional students surrendered to authorities, and two students were killed in a shooting incident. The government decided to delay the assault, hoping for the safe evacuation of more students from the besieged mosque. President Pervez Musharraf issued an ultimatum on the evening of 7 July 2007. The Pakistani army took over the operation and replaced the paramilitary troops deployed around the premises. A thirteen-year-old child escaped from the besieged mosque unharmed.

Pakistani commandos raided the outer perimeter of the compound, blasting holes through the walls of the mosque to allow trapped women and children to escape. The assaults began shortly after 1:00 am (20:00 GMT) on 7 July 2007 and were met with heavy armed resistance. Special Service Group Commander Lt. Col. Haroon-ul-Islam, who had been leading the operation, was wounded on 6 July 2007 and died in the hospital two days later. However, the commandos succeeded, and the boundary wall of Lal Masjid and Jamia Hafsa collapsed. Abdul Rashid Ghazi said they would not surrender and that they had sufficient ammunition and rations to last a month.

On 9 July 2007, a group representing Pakistani madrasahs, headed by Maulana Salimullah Khan, called for an immediate cessation of the Lal Masjid operation. Finland also temporarily closed its embassy in Islamabad on 9 July 2007 due to the deteriorating security situation and the proximity of the embassy to the mosque compound. By 10 July 2007, the Pakistani government reported that 100 militants and between 300 and 400 women and children remained inside the mosque.

Attack on Musharraf's aircraft 
On Friday, 6 July 2007, President General Musharraf left for the flood-affected areas of Balochistan. As the president's aircraft took off from the Islamabad airport, militants fired anti-aircraft weapons at it from the roof of a house in the Asghar Mall area of Rawalpindi. The militants' relationship with Lal Masjid remains unknown. Security forces recovered two anti-aircraft guns and a machine gun on the rooftop of a Rawalpindi high-rise, one mile (1.6 km) from the airport. The government asserted that shots were heard minutes after the president's aircraft took off. Analysts suggest that it may have been retaliation for ongoing operations against Lal Masjid and the government's continued efforts to combat terrorism and Talibanization in northern Waziristan.

Preparation for the assault 
Predator unmanned aerial vehicles flew over Lal Masjid and Jamia Hafsa on 8 and 9 July 2007, capturing images of the deployment of people inside. Security forces had the images taken to study the claims of Ghazi Abdul Rashid regarding casualties and damage caused to Lal Masjid and Jamia Hafsa. The unmanned Predators flew over Lal Masjid and Jamia Hafsa for more than an hour, from 2:40 to 4:00 am. Senior government officials and the Security Forces personnel examined the pictures and relayed the information directly to the command post on the ground. The Predators had been given to Pakistan by the United States for use in the War on Terror. Strategic planning for the assault on the mosque was conducted based on information gathered by the drone. Pakistan deployed several security units to execute the attack on the mosque. These include the Army's 78th Paratrooper Brigade and 111th Infantry Brigade; its elite strike force, the Special Service Group Division; the Ninth Wing Company of the Pakistan Army, the Rangers paramilitary force; and the Elite Police squad of the Punjab Police.

The assault

Battle for the mosque 
On the morning of 10 July 2007, former Prime Minister Chaudhry Shujaat Hussain and Federal Religious Affairs Minister Muhammad Ijaz-ul-Haq declared that peace negotiations via loudspeaker and mobile phone had failed. Within minutes, the Special Service Group were issued orders to storm the mosque. Pakistan Army spokesman Waheed Arshad said troops began by attacking and breaching the mosque from the south and assaulted it from three directions at 4:00 am (23:00 GMT). The forces immediately came under gunfire from heavily armed militants hunkered down behind sandbagged positions on the roof and from holes in the walls of the mosque. The Special Service Group quickly cleared the mosque's ground floor, amid explosions coming from the mosque. About 30 women and children ran toward the advancing Special Service Group operators and managed to escape unharmed.

While the Special Service Group secured the ground floor of the mosque, they continually received fire from the mosque's minarets. This slowed the operation's progress. On the mosque roof, militants had piled sandbags at the base of the minarets, which they now used as steps to shoot at troops below. After the minarets were taken, the Special Service Group progressed deeper into the complex, and the militants threw gasoline bombs in an unsuccessful attempt to set fire to the mosque and stop the assault. Once the ground floor was secured, the Special Service Group attempted to enter the Jamia Hafsa madrasah adjoining the mosque but were delayed by booby traps, which had to be disabled before they could continue into the complex.

Battle for the Jamia Hafsa complex 
The Special Service Group entered the complex, in order to take over the control of Jamia Hafsa which also served as Abdul Rasid Ghazi's living quarters, and engaged in a firefight in the main courtyard. Militants fired on them from makeshift bunkers beneath the stairwell. Army spokesman Arshad later stated that the militants must have been fortifying the bunkers for several months. Once the courtyard was cleared, the Special Service Group entered the labyrinth of the Jamia Hafsa building. Militants inside were armed with guns and rockets, and some areas were booby-trapped. Some militants had bullet- and explosion-proof vests and other sophisticated weapons. The Special Service Group suffered most of their casualties during this phase of the operation. In close-quarter combat, they were attacked with smoke grenades, incendiary grenades, and fragmentation grenades. Twenty-nine of the thirty-three Special Service Group commandos who were injured in the operation received injuries from fragmentation grenades. As the fight continued, they came upon a room in which half a dozen militants were present. One of the militants detonated a suicide jacket, killing everyone in the room. It took several hours of intense fighting before the Special Service Group gained control of Jamia Hafsa, with only the basement remaining to be secured.

Final stand 
Arshad said troops had secured 80 percent of the complex and were moving slowly, as the resistance was intense in the remaining areas. The standoff continued, as heavily armed militants had retreated into the basement using women and children as human shields, according to the Pakistan Army spokesman. The militants in the basement resisted with machine guns, shoulder-fired rockets, and Molotov cocktails. In a last interview with Geo TV during the operation, Abdul Rashid Ghazi, who was hunkered down in the basement, claimed that his mother had been wounded by gunfire and was quoted as saying: "The government is using full force. This is naked aggression... my murder is certain now." Ghazi also claimed that 30 rebels were still battling Pakistani troops, but they only had 14 AK-47s.

Militants continued to fire at the Special Service Group commandos from ventilation grilles in the basement. During the firefight, Abdul Rashid Ghazi was shot in the leg and was asked to surrender. However, militants in the room fired back, and Ghazi was killed in the crossfire. Other reports say that Ghazi came out of a bunker to surrender, only to be shot by his own forces. The fighting continued until all the personnel trapped in the basement either surrendered or were killed.

Behind an Army cordon, emergency workers waited for clearance to enter Lal Masjid. Female police officers were present to handle female survivors and casualties. Relatives of the militants inside the Lal Masjid were also outside the cordon. The Associated Press reported: "The siege has given the neighborhood the look of a war zone", with troops manning machine guns behind sandbagged posts and from the top of armoured vehicles.

Mosque secured 
On 11 July 2007, officials reported that the Lal Masjid complex had been cleared of militants, and troops were combing the area for booby traps and explosives. The eight-day Lal Masjid operation was the longest ever conducted by the Special Service Group.

According to Inter-Services Public Relations, weapons were recovered from the bullet-riddled Lal Masjid and Jamia Hafsa complexes, including RPG rockets, anti-tank and anti-personnel landmines, suicide bombing belts, three to five .22-caliber rifles, RPD, RPK and RPK-74 light machine guns, Dragunov Sniper Rifles, SKS rifles, AK-47s, pistols, night vision equipment, and more than 50,000 rounds of various calibre ammunition. Lesser sophisticated items and weaponry recovered from the complex included three crates of gasoline bombs prepared in green soft drink bottles, gas masks, recoilless rifles, two-way radios, large plastic buckets containing homemade bombs the size of tennis balls, as well as knives.

Intelligence agencies expressed shock at the highly sophisticated weapons that the militants in the Lal Masjid and Jamia Hafsa compound had, and began an investigation into where the equipment came from. Pakistan Army spokesman Waheed Arshad said that a suicide bomber had detonated himself in the mosque located at the opposite side of the complex to the seminary. Arshad also said a second suicide bomber had detonated himself in the white-domed mosque. In total, it took 36 hours to fully secure the complex and remove the booby traps.

Casualties 
Officials in Islamabad considered the operation a success, citing that they were able to subdue all the fighters inside the mosque—a group that allegedly included foreign terrorists—without a heavy civilian toll. "The number of casualties was much lower than it could have been," said Shaukat Aziz, Pakistan's prime minister. Of the 164 Special Services Group Army commandos that participated in the siege and later assault of the mosque, 10 died and 33 were wounded.

The Inspector General of Police reported that from 3 July until 11 July 2007, 1,096 people628 men, 465 women, and 3 childrenleft or were rescued from the complex. The inspector also confirmed that 102 people were killed during the operation: 91 militants, 10 Special Service Group commandos, and 1 ranger. This includes the sixteen dead on 10 July 2007. A total of 248 people were injured, including 204 civilians, 41 army soldiers, and 3 Rangers. Seventy-five bodies were recovered from the premises after the operation. Securing Lal Masjid brought an end to nine days of high tension in Islamabad, normally a tranquil city that had been immune to the violence experienced in the tribal areas of Pakistan.

Army spokesman Arshad said that, during the operation, 85 people were rescued from the complex, of whom 56 were male. He also said 39 of those rescued were under the age of eighteen. "With militants in different rooms, firing from behind pillars, and then going into basements and clearing it, you can understand the difficulties," Arshad told journalists.

Nineteen bodies were burned beyond recognition, but none of them appeared to be women or children, according to Pakistani officials. An article in The Nation, cited a grave digger at the cemetery where the bodies were being buried, who claimed there was the possibility that there may have been more than one body in each coffin. The article also stated that the government was digging more graves than previously established. The Muttahida Majlis-e-Amal, a coalition of hard-line religious parties, claimed that between 400 and 1,000 students had been killed, along with women and children. Spanish-language news channels Univision, Antena 3, and Telecinco claimed that the total number of deaths in the siege was greater than 286 and could be as high as 300.

Pakistani investigators probing links between Lal Masjid and terrorists have discovered the enrolment registers listing the students who studied at the seminary. The investigators believe the information, found in the Jamia Hafsa complex, will help clarify the number of people killed or missing in the operation. Officials believe the list of registered students matches the number of students evacuated or captured from the mosque and Jamia Hafsa.

Damage to mosque 
The damage to Lal Masjid was extensive. The entrance hall was completely burned out, the ceiling scorched, and the red walls above the oval doorway blackened. However, the mosque itself sustained less damage than the Jamia Hafsa seminary. Bullet casings were found all over the mosque roof, and the inside of Lal Masjid was turned coal black from the militants trying to set the mosque on fire using gasoline bombs. Militants used the mosque's two white minarets as vantage points, resulting in damage to the minarets. One minaret was completely destroyed, and its speakers were hanging from their wires. The dome, however, was not damaged during the 36-hour battle. The director general of the Inter Services Public Relations said photographs of the bodies seem to indicate that there were foreigners among the dead.

In the Jamia Hafsa complex, damage was extensive, with thousands of bullet holes in the courtyard. The basement was blackened from rockets. The main buildings of the complex were structurally intact, but the boundary walls had been breached in several places. The building had bullet marks in its cement structure. The two courtyards inside the school were filled with shattered glass and spent rounds. Piles of the girls' bed rolls and stacks of books were piled against walls.

On 15 July 2007, the Capital Development Authority was asked by the government to complete the repair and rehabilitation of Lal Masjid in 15 days, and on 27 July 2007, the mosque was reopened to the public. However, the Jamia Hafsa complex was demolished, as it was illegally constructed and in danger of collapsing.

Al-Qaeda and foreign fighters 
Pakistani intelligence officials said they found letters from Osama bin Laden's deputy, Ayman al-Zawahiri, after taking control of Lal Masjid. They were written to Abdul Rashid Ghazi and Abdul Aziz Ghazi, directing the brothers and militants to conduct an armed revolt. Government sources believe that as many as 18 foreign fighters from Uzbekistan, Egypt, and Afghanistan had arrived weeks before the final confrontation and established firing ranges to teach the students, including children, how to handle weapons properly. Diplomats were surprised by how quickly al-Zawahiri condemned the attack on the mosque and called on Pakistanis to rise up against Musharraf's government. Officials blamed the presence of foreign fighters for the breakdown of negotiations, as they seemed about to reach a deal to end the standoff peacefully. According to government sources and western diplomats, the al-Qaeda fighters in the mosque sought martyrdom instead.

Al-Qaeda's second-in-command, al-Zawahiri, issued a videotape on 11 July 2007, calling for Pakistanis to join jihad in revenge for the attack by the Pakistan's Army on the mosque. Al-Zawahri's four-minute address was titled The Aggression against Lal Masjid and dedicated solely to the clash between the Lal Masjid militants and the Pakistan Army. The video was released by al-Qaeda's media wing as-Sahab and subtitled in English.

Reactions

Pakistani public 
Although many Pakistanis were silent about the operation against Lal Masjid, most agreed with the government's decision to use force to retake the complex. While hardliners have been able to stir up anger every time Musharraf moves against militants, most people have been tolerant and oppose the militants desire to impose their interpretation of Islamic law. Most residents of Islamabad agree that the raid restored local peace, despite fears of retaliation.

Pakistani media 
In a televised address to the nation, Musharraf declared that he was determined to eradicate extremism and terrorism in Pakistan. Dawn supported the government's actions against Lal Masjid but questioned "how the intelligence agencies failed to get wind of the goings-on in the Lal Masjid and the stockpiling of arms and ammunition in such large quantities."

The Daily Times also supported the government's position and added: "Let us be clear. No government can violate the universal principle of 'no negotiation with terrorists' and live to be praised." The News was more critical, stating: "Once 'Operation Silence' is over, the firing stops, the dust settles down and the bodies are counted, there are bound to be many questions raised. Why didn't the government take action earlier against the clerics because had that been the case so many lives would not have been lost? Why were the Lal Masjid elements allowed so much leeway that the complex became almost like a state within a state, complete with a moral policing force which acted with impunity enforcing a rigid interpretation of Islam on the city's residents? How did so many hardened militants, reportedly some foreigners among them, make their way inside the compound situated in the heart of Islamabad?".

The Post was worried about how the episode would affect Pakistan: "This is going to ratchet up religious sentiments, and could lead to increased polarization between the moderates and extremists in the country, the former including General Musharraf under the banner of 'enlightened moderation'." The Islam newspaper criticised the government, stating: "The government cannot absolve itself of the tragedy. If it wanted, the matter could have been resolved at the start. But this was not done and, for the first time in the history of Pakistan, our own security forces not only bombarded a mosque and religious seminary, but also brought in armored personnel carriers, tanks and helicopter gunships in numbers that made you wonder. This shows that all this activity was masterminded by some Satanic minds. This incident is tragic, shameful and dangerous. How much it has harmed the country and the nation, and how worse an impact it will leave on the country on the future, can at this point only be imagined."

Nawa-i-Waqt wrote in its editorial: "The entire nation is drowned in shock and grief today. They are mourning the brute use of force. Now we need a comprehensive inquiry over the operation against the Red Mosque. The report should be made public so that the people can know the actual facts." The Ausaf daily countered, "The entire nation is grieving... only the United States wanted what happened and proof of that is that the storming operation was celebrated at the White House and Pentagon rather than at General Musharraf's headquarters."

The Pakistan Observer praised the government: "The Government deserves credit for showing remarkable tolerance and patience and exhausted all possible avenues for peaceful settlement of the nerve-shattering crisis".

International reaction 
China backed Musharraf in his stand against Lal Masjid. The Chinese Minister of Public Security, Zhou Yongkang, referred explicitly to the Lal Masjid militants as terrorists and demanded that Pakistan act more forcefully to protect Chinese nationals working in the country.

The European Union President, José Manuel Barroso, issued a statement that it "supports the Government of Pakistan in the defense of the rule of law and the writ of the State against the threat posed by such armed radical groups in the context of the fight against extremism." The EU also praised the "restraint and moderation showed by the Pakistani authorities."

United States President George W. Bush gave his support to Musharraf as "a strong ally in the war against these extremists." State Department deputy spokesman Tom Casey noted that the militants had been given many warnings before the commandos moved on the Red Mosque. He said: "The government of Pakistan has proceeded in a responsible way. All governments have a responsibility to preserve order." Bryan D. Hunt, of the United States' consulate in Lahore, was quoted as saying that the U.S. government supported the Pakistani government and that "the militants were given many warnings but instead of surrendering they decided to fight and challenge the writ of government." Hunt also said that the U.S. fully supported Pakistan in their War on Terror and considers Pakistan "their closest ally in South Asia." Religious parties and figures criticised the support extended by the U.S. consular official and demanded that the government expel him for interfering in Pakistan's internal affairs. A Pakistani Foreign Office spokesperson Tasneem Aslam characterised the U.S. consulate official's statement as contrary to diplomatic norms, and open interference in the country's internal affairs. She said a protest would be lodged.

Aftermath 

On 16 August 2007, acting on a suo motu notice, the Supreme Court of Pakistan took up the extrajudicial killings of the people at the Lal Masjid and Jamia Hafsa complex. Performance of the Islamabad administration attracted the reprimand of the court for its slow pace. The court was informed that 61 students were in custody, of whom 39 were on bailable offences. The Chief Justice of Pakistan ordered immediate release of 20 people considered innocent, as recommended by a joint investigation team. National Crisis Management Cell Director Javed Iqbal Cheema told the court that 28 DNA tests had not been confirmed. The Chief Justice also pointed out that Islamabad Deputy Commissioner Mohammad Ali had stated that 30 bodies remained unidentified.

Mohammed Ahsan Bhoon, president of the Lahore High Court Bar Association, said, "This issue could have been resolved through negotiations but General Musharraf intentionally spilled the blood of innocent people to please his foreign masters." Deputy Information Minister Tariq Azim said that the Lal Masjid assault had sent a strong message that the government "meant business." Musharraf vowed in a nationally televised address that he would "crush extremists throughout Pakistan and move against religious schools like those at the Lal Masjid and those that breed them."

According to journalist Deborah Scroggins, the storming of the masjid became a turning point for Pakistan.... Many of the militant Pakistanis in Waziristan and on the border with Kashmir had had young relative in the shattered mosque, and they began attacking the army in revenge. This broke or at least badly damaged the "long standing alliance" between the Deobandi jihadis and the military.

The Lal Masjid siege gave hardliners in Pakistan a rallying point, as well as generating new martyrs (i.e. volunteers to commit suicide bombings) and prompting al-Qaeda, Jaish-e-Muhammad, Lashkar-e-Jhangvi, and the Taliban to launch retaliation attacks in Pakistan. In the next five months suicide bombers committed 56 attacks killing 2729 Pakistanis.

The first attack after the operation against the mosque was on 12 July 2007; two suicide attacks killed six people in northwest Pakistan. Another 28 soldiers were killed when a suicide attacker struck a military convoy in northwest Pakistan near the Afghan border on 14 July. Several terrorist attacks were carried out throughout Pakistan in July.

The bodies of seventy militants from the Lal Masjid operation were buried in a graveyard near Islamabad. To assist relatives in identifying and in claiming the bodies later, officials took photographs, fingerprints, and DNA samples from the bodies prior to their interment in temporary graves.

In October 2013, Musharraf was arrested, days after being bailed on other charges, for being personally responsible for ordering the siege. It came two weeks after a case was filed over his responsibility. In February 2016, a local courts judge issued non-bailable warrants for the arrest of Musharraf for his 'deliberate' absence from the proceedings of the murder case of Lal Masjid cleric Abdul Rashid Ghazi.

In 2015, a documentary film Among the Believers was released. It was filmed over a five-year period in which Aziz and his students were interviewed. The documentary portrayed the periods before, during and after the siege of the Lal Masjid.

2008 

On 6 July 2008, at 7:50 pm local time, a bomb exploded near Lal Masjid killing 18 policemen and a civilian. Pakistani officials claim that the bombing, which occurred on the first anniversary of the siege, was a revenge attack and the work of a 30-year-old suicide bomber.

See also 
 August 2013 Rabaa massacre
 Grand Mosque seizure, similar event in Saudi Arabia regarding the siege of Masjid al-Haram
 Memali Incident, similar event in the Malaysia
 Operation Blue Star, Golden Temple, Amritsar, India, 1984
 Waco siege, similar event in the US

References

Further reading

External links 
  Lal Masjid Official WebSite
 Jamia Hafsa Official WebSite

2007 in Pakistan
Al-Qaeda activities
Operation Sunrise
Lal Masjid
Conflicts in 2007
Pakistan military scandals
Events in Islamabad
Mass murder in 2007
Military history of Pakistan
Islamism in Pakistan
Massacres in religious buildings and structures
Military operations of the insurgency in Khyber Pakhtunkhwa
Government of Shaukat Aziz
Burned buildings and structures in Pakistan
2000s in Islamabad
Hostage taking in Pakistan
July 2007 events in Pakistan
Punjab Rangers
Attacks on religious buildings and structures in Pakistan
Human shield incidents
2007 in Pakistani politics